Enoblituzumab is a monoclonal antibody designed for the treatment of cancer. Formerly known as MGA271, the drug is a humanized IgG1κ monoclonal antibody recognizing human B7-H3, a member of the B7 family of immune regulators. 

This drug was developed by MacroGenics, Inc.

References 

Monoclonal antibodies